Laner is a surname. Notable people with the surname include:

 Alexander Laner (born 1974), German artist
 Brad Laner (born 1966), American musician and record producer
 Edith Laner (1921–2000), British magistrate
 Simon Laner (born 1984), Italian footballer

See also
 Laney (surname)